Laškov is a municipality and village in Prostějov District in the Olomouc Region of the Czech Republic. It has about 600 inhabitants.

Administrative parts
Villages of Dvorek, Kandia and Krakovec are administrative parts of Laškov.

References

Villages in Prostějov District